KZOT (1180 AM) is a radio station licensed to Bellevue, Nebraska, United States and serving the Omaha metropolitan area. The station is owned by NRG Media and the license is held by NRG License Sub, LLC. Studios are located at Dodge Street and 50th Avenue in Midtown Omaha, and the transmitter site is located in Council Bluffs, Iowa.

Programming
Since flipping from news/talk on June 4, 2012, KOIL has broadcast a sports talk format branded as "The Zone 2". Weekday programs include shows hosted by John Harris, Steve Czaban, Tim Brando, Dan Patrick, Craig Shemon, Travis Rogers, Doug Russell, plus a special Thursday night program hosted by Pat Forde and Dan Wetzel.

History
This station received its original construction permit from the Federal Communications Commission (FCC) on May 21, 1984,  for a new station licensed to Bellevue, Nebraska and transmitting on 1180 kHz.  The new station was assigned the call letters KNPE on August 15, 1984. On January 22, 1987, while still under construction, the station was granted the call sign KKAR. After several extensions, two transfers, and a permit renewal, Mitchell Broadcasting Company received a license to cover KKAR's operation on April 26, 1989.

In September 1990, the station applied for an increase in daytime power to 25,000 watts, and the construction permit was granted in February 1991. On August 24, 1993, the station was assigned its first use of the KOIL call letters, a heritage Omaha broadcast call sign that dates back to 1925, in a swap with the original KOIL, which became KKAR.

Expanded Band assignment

On March 17, 1997 the FCC announced that eighty-eight stations had been given permission to move to newly available "Expanded Band" transmitting frequencies, ranging from 1610 to 1700 kHz, with KOIL authorized to move from 1180 to 1620 kHz. A construction permit for the expanded band station, also located in Bellevue, was assigned the call letters KAZP (now KOZN) on January 9, 1998. The new station began operating in September 1999.

The FCC's initial policy was that both the original station and its expanded band counterpart could operate simultaneously for up to five years, after which owners would have to turn in one of the two licenses, depending on whether they preferred the new assignment or elected to remain on the original frequency. However, this deadline has been extended multiple times, and operations have remained authorized on both 1180 and 1620 kHz. One restriction is that the FCC has generally required paired original and expanded band stations to remain under common ownership.

Later history

After a lengthy series of extensions, on June 23, 1998 KOIL was licensed to operate at the increased daytime power of 25,000 watts on 1180 kHz. In August 1999, the station dropped its sports radio programming to become a full-time affiliate of Radio Disney.

In April 2000, Mitchell Broadcasting Company, Inc. applied to transfer KOIL's license to JCM Broadcasting Co., LLC (John C. Mitchell, president). The deal was approved by the FCC on May 19, 2000, and the transaction consummated on July 5, 2000. In December 2001 an agreement was reached to sell the station to Waitt Radio, Inc. (Norman W. Waitt Jr., chairman) as part of a 16-station deal valued at $36.6 million. The transaction was approved by the FCC on February 26, 2002, and was consummated on March 5, 2002.

On April 22, 2003, the station was assigned the callsign KYDZ to better match its status as the local Radio Disney affiliate. The KOIL callsign was moved to sister station KKSC (now KMMQ).

 In 2005, the entire Waitt Radio station group, including KYDZ, was transferred to NRG Media, also owned by Norman W. Waitt Jr.

In June 2006, the station's format was flipped to Spanish Classic Hits, including a blend of Mexican and other Latin American music from the 1970s and 1980s, and given the on-air branding "La Bonita."

On January 1, 2009, the station returned to the historic KOIL call sign as the format flipped to syndicated news/talk. As a news/talk station, notable syndicated programming on KOIL included Morning in America hosted by Bill Bennett, plus syndicated talk shows hosted by Neal Boortz, Clark Howard, Dennis Miller, Dave Ramsey, Rusty Humphries, Lars Larson, and Mike Gallagher.

The station adopted a sports talk format and changed its call sign to KZOT on June 4, 2012; the KOIL call sign was returned to its location prior to 1993 at 1290 AM.

References

External links

ZOT
Sports radio stations in the United States
Radio stations established in 1987
NRG Media radio stations